Mihkel Laar (1883–?) was an Estonian politician. He was a member of II Riigikogu. He was a member of the Riigikogu since 8 March 1924. He replaced Jaan Miger. On 22 March 1924, he resigned his position and he was replaced by Peeter Michelson.

References

1883 births
Year of death missing
Workers' United Front politicians
Members of the Riigikogu, 1923–1926